Eqbal (Luck) was a Persian reformist newspaper published in Iran. It was shut down in July 2005.

History and profile
Eqbal was a reformist daily of which managing editor was Morteza Fallah. It was unofficially affiliated to the leading reformist party, the Islamic Iran Participation Front. Karim Arqandehpour was among senior editors of the paper. The paper supported Mostafa Moin in the presidential election in 2005.

Closure 	
In June 2005, before the presidential election, the paper along with Aftab Yazd published the letter of presidential candidate Mehdi Karrubi to Supreme Leader Ali Khamenei. Upon this incident both papers were banned for one day by Tehran Public and Revolutionary Court on 20 June. In fact, two more dailies, namely Etemad, and Hayat-e-No, also published the letter of Karrubi and were banned by the same body. Following the ban Eqbal continued until July 2005 when it was closed down by the Iranian judiciary  "for spreading lies and publishing false reports unrelated to Karrubi’s letter."

References

2005 disestablishments in Iran
Banned newspapers
Censorship in Iran
Defunct newspapers published in Iran
Newspapers published in Tehran
Persian-language newspapers
Publications disestablished in 2005
Publications with year of establishment missing